The South Coast Conference is a college athletic conference that is affiliated with the California Community College Athletic Association.   Its members are primarily based in the Los Angeles region.

Members 
The league has 12 full members:

Former Member

References

External links
Official website
CCCAA website

CCCAA conferences